Newquay Treloggan is an electoral division of Cornwall in the United Kingdom and returns one member to sit on Cornwall Council. The current Councillor is Oliver Monk, a Conservative.

Extent
Newquay Treloggan covers the south of the town of Newquay, including the suburbs of Trenance and Treninnick. The division covers 110 hectares in total.

Election results

2017 election

2013 election

2009 election

References

Newquay
Electoral divisions of Cornwall Council